The Harlan Institute is a non-profit organization that provides education on constitutional law to high school students. The organization was founded in 2007 by Josh Blackman and Josh Craddock, two law students who wanted to make legal education more accessible to high school students. It focuses on the study of the Supreme Court of the United States and on constitutional law.

The institute was co-founded by Josh Blackman and Yaakov Roth. Blackman is currently president of its board of directors.

References

External links
 The Harlan Institute

Organizations established in 2009